This is a list of notable converts to Buddhism from Christianity.

See also 
 Dalit Buddhist Movement
 List of converts to Buddhism
 List of converts to Buddhism from Islam
 List of converts to Buddhism from Hinduism
 Jewish Buddhists
 Comparison of Buddhism and Christianity
 Buddhism and Christianity
 Index of Buddhism-related articles

References

 
Converts to Buddhism
Buddhism from Christianity